Ramsbotham is a surname. Notable people with the surname include:

David Ramsbotham, Baron Ramsbotham GCB CBE (born 1934), retired British Army officer, later Her Majesty's Chief Inspector of Prisons
Herwald Ramsbotham, 1st Viscount Soulbury GCMG, GCVO, OBE, MC, PC (1887–1971), British Conservative politician
John Alexander Ramsbotham (1906–1989), eminent Anglican clergyman during the middle third of the 20th century
Peter Ramsbotham, 3rd Viscount Soulbury, GCMG, GCVO, DL (1919–2010), former British diplomat and colonial administrator
Ramsbotham Jump, a type of interstellar teleporter in Robert A. Heinlein's novel Tunnel in the Sky.

See also
Ramsbottom